Gills is a rural unincorporated community in Amelia County in the U.S. state of Virginia, located around the intersections of SR 616 (S. Genito Road) with SR 657 (Selma Road),  north of the Nottoway county line.

Gills was known as Pride's Church for much of the 1800s. A post office called "Pride Church" operated briefly in Amelia County in the early 1820s, although it is unclear whether it was the same community. A post office called "Pride's Church" was established around 1852, a spot noted on period maps at the location later called Gills. An "A. Gills", presumably a member of the town's namesake family, lived just east on Pride's Church Road (modern-day Route 657). The church itself, which dated back to the 1700s, was noted for a sermon delivered in the 1840s by guest preacher Moses Drury Hoge, a son of minister, educator, and abolitionist Moses Hoge.

By 1900, a post office was in service using the name Gills, although the village was also called New London during part of the 20th century. Most of the vicinity of Gills is now served by the post office 7 miles east at Jetersville, ZIP code 23083; small portions are served by the post offices in Rice (ZIP code 23966) and Burkeville (ZIP code 23922) in neighboring counties.

Gills lies near the route followed by Confederate general Robert E. Lee and his army in their retreat during the final days of the Civil War, before the surrender to Ulysses S. Grant at Appomattox on April 9, 1865. The last major battle fought by Lee's army occurred just over a mile west at Sayler's Creek, on the border of Amelia and Prince Edward counties, on April 6. The countryside around the battlefield still looks much as it did in the 1860s. 

Farmer House, 3 miles east of Gills, was added to the National Register of Historic Places in 1978.

References

Unincorporated communities in Virginia
Unincorporated communities in Amelia County, Virginia